The Taifa of Jaén was a medieval Islamic taifa Moorish kingdom centered in Al-Andalus. It existed for only two very short periods: first in 1145 and then in 1168. It was ruled by Arabs of the Banu Khazraj tribe. The Taifa was centred in the present day region of Jaén in southern Spain.

List of Emirs

Yuzaid dynasty

Ibn Yuzai: 1145

Huddid dynasty

Abu Dja'far Ahmad Zafadola (also Cord., Gran., Val.): 1145
To Almohads: 1145–1159
To Murcia: 1159–1168

Hamuskid dynasty

Ibrahim: 1168
To Murcia: 1168–1232

1168 disestablishments
States and territories established in 1145
Jaen